'Sandarbham' is a 1984 Malayalam film directed by Joshy, written by Cochin Haneefa, screenplay by Kaloor Dennis, and starring Mammootty, Sukumaran, Saritha, Seema, P. K. Abraham, K. P. A. C. Sunny and Unni Mary.

The film is a typical tear-jerker family-drama tragedy of the 1980s. Films of this genre typically featured a happy family in the beginning, with a well placed husband-cum-father, a young mother and a girl child of the age of 3 or 4. In the end, the family gets into a whirlpool of relationship problems. The film was remade in Tamil as Paadatha Thenikkal.

Cast

Baby Shalini
Saritha
Mammootty
KPAC Sunny
P. K. Abraham
Vazhoor Rajan
Seema
M. G. Soman
Sukumaran
Prathapachandran
Cochin Haneefa
Rohini
Nellikode Bhaskaran

Release
The film was released on 11 May 1984.

Box office
The film was both commercial and critical success.

Soundtrack
The music was composed by Johnson and the lyrics were written by Poovachal Khader.

References

External links
 

1984 films
1980s Malayalam-language films
Indian drama films
Malayalam films remade in other languages
Films directed by Joshiy